Eugene Miller (January 25, 1899 – July 8, 1948) was a Democratic politician in the Texas Senate for six years.

He represented Texas Senate, District 22. He was President pro tempore of the Texas Senate in the Forty-first Texas Legislature 1929–1931. He was a member of the Texas House of Representatives from 1921–1925.

References

1899 births
1948 deaths
Democratic Party members of the Texas House of Representatives
Presidents pro tempore of the Texas Senate
Democratic Party Texas state senators
20th-century American politicians